Charlotte Bruus Christensen (born 20 March 1978) is a Danish cinematographer.

Biography 
Born in Denmark, Christensen earned a master's degree in cinematography from the National Film and Television School in the UK, in 2004. After film school she returned to Denmark where she wrote, directed and shot the 2004 short film Between Us. She worked with director Thomas Vinterberg on his 2010 drama film Submarino. She was cinematographer for the Marc Evans' 2011 film Hunky Dory. She continued to work with Vinterberg in the 2012 film The Hunt. Her cinematography, shot on Arri Alexa, won her a Vulcan Award and the Bodil Award for Best Cinematographer. Chistensen and Vinterberg teamed up a third time for the 2015 film Far from the Madding Crowd. She is known for ability to bring out the female gaze, highlighting the female leads in her films.

Cinematography 
A lot of Christensen's work is inspired from the Dogme 95 movement, where the focus is back on the traditional aspects of filmmaking such as stories, characters, and thematic elements. Christensen has spoken on her cinematography work on A Quiet Place through numerous interviews. A lot of the visual and tonal inspiration for the film came from other films like Jaws, No Country for Old Men, and There Will Be Blood. The film was shot on 35 mm, like the aforementioned movies. She has talked about how they had to capture images with sound in mind. The closer you are to something, the more little sounds are involved. It was more than just having the camera zoomed in on the subject and more about having the camera physically next to an object or person to catch all the sounds involved. Both Christensen and John Krasinski, the director, agreed that the film is warm and that those tones should be seen in various pockets- through the season (summer), clothing items, in nature, and elsewhere. She also had the challenge of working with the color red. Since the color is used to signal a warning, its thematic use isn't present until it needs to be; it's in that moment where it holds the most power. Her main goal was to highlight the unheard and unseen through her camera work. In other films like Fences and The Girl on the Train, you can clearly see how her cinematography impacts the suspense and intensity of the film. She knows how to highlight the emotions of the characters within the scene, especially lead females where she ensures they're highlighted in the right way.

Filmography
Film

Television

Awards and nominations 
 Sue Gibson Award by The NFTS, 2017
 The WIFTS Cinematography Award, 2015
 Robert Nomination, Danish Film Academy 2013 for The Hunt
 Vulcan Award of the Technical Artist at the 2012 Cannes Film Festival for The Hunt (Jagten), directed by Thomas Vinterberg
 Robert Nomination, Danish Film Academy 2010 for Submarino
 Golden Frog Nomination, Camerimage 2010 for Submarino
 Broadcast Young Talent Award 2005 for Between Us
 BSC and Kodak Showcase Cinematographer Award 2005 for Between Us
 Best Cinematography Bulgaria 2004 for ISpider

References

External links 
 
 Charlotte Bruus Christensen at Mubi

Living people
Alumni of the National Film and Television School
Danish cinematographers
Danish women cinematographers
1978 births
Best Cinematographer Bodil Award winners